The Ranchero's Revenge is a 1913 American short silent Western film directed by D. W. Griffith.

Cast
 Lionel Barrymore as The Ranchero
 Harry Carey as The Schemer
 Claire McDowell as The Schemer's Associate
 Clarence Barr as The Chinese Cook (as Clarence L. Barr)
 Viola Barry as At Party
 William Courtright as At Wedding
 Charles Hill Mailes as At Party

See also
 Harry Carey filmography
 D. W. Griffith filmography
 Lionel Barrymore filmography

External links
 

1913 films
1913 Western (genre) films
1913 short films
American silent short films
American black-and-white films
Films directed by D. W. Griffith
Silent American Western (genre) films
1910s American films